Corythoichthys insularis is a species of marine fish in the family Syngnathidae. It is found in the western Indian Ocean, from the Amirante and Comoros islands to the Maldives. The male carries the fertilised eggs in a brood pouch located under his tail.

References

Further reading

WoRMS

insularis
Marine fish
Fish described in 1977
Fish of the Indian Ocean